Phrudocentra is a genus of moths in the family Geometridae. The genus was described by Warren in 1895.

Species
Phrudocentra centrifugaria (Herrich-Schäffer, 1870) Florida, Greater Antilles - Puerto Rico
Phrudocentra impunctata (Warren, 1909) Dominica
Phrudocentra kinstonensis (Butler, 1878) Jamaica
Phrudocentra neis (Druce, 1892) southern Texas, Mexico - Panama
Phrudocentra pupillata (Warren, 1897) Guyana

References

Geometrinae